Arvor Hansen (5 November 1886 – 19 June 1962) was a Danish gymnast who competed in the 1908 Summer Olympics and in the 1912 Summer Olympics.

He was part of the Danish team, which finished fourth in the gymnastics team event in 1908. Four years later he won the bronze medal in the gymnastics men's team, free system event. In the individual all-around competition he finished 26th.

References

External links
 

1886 births
1962 deaths
Danish male artistic gymnasts
Gymnasts at the 1908 Summer Olympics
Gymnasts at the 1912 Summer Olympics
Olympic gymnasts of Denmark
Olympic bronze medalists for Denmark
Olympic medalists in gymnastics
Medalists at the 1912 Summer Olympics